First Time is the debut extended play by English singer Liam Payne. Primarily produced by Di Genius, Burns, Jason Gill, Steve Fitzmaurice, Cutfather, MdL and Sly, it was released on 24 August 2018 by Capitol Records. Its title track, which features a guest appearance from American hip hop recording artist French Montana, was released on the same day as its lead single.

Background
On 16 August 2018, Payne announced the release date of the EP. He also posted a message on his social media, saying:

Track listing
Credits adapted from Tidal.

Personnel

 Liam Payne – vocals 
 French Montana – vocals 
 Di Genius – production 
 Burns – production 
 Randy Merrill – master engineering 
 Oak Felder – engineering 
 Jacob Richards – mixing assistance 
 David Nakaji – mixing assistance 
 Rashawn Mclean – mixing assistance 
 Jaycen Joshua – mixing 
 Jason Gill – production , bass guitar , drums , record engineering , synthesizer programming 
 Phil Tan – mixing 
 Benjamin Rice – record engineering 
 Brandon Skeie – additional vocals 
 Steve Fitzmaurice – production , record engineering 
 Darren Heelis – bass guitar , mixing 
 Jules Gulon – mixing assistance 
 Will Purton – record engineering assistance 
 Reuben James – piano 
 Ben "Bengineer" Chang – vocal production 
 Cutfather – production 
 MdL – production 
 Sly – production 
 Bill Zimmerman – engineering

Charts

References

2018 debut EPs
Liam Payne EPs
Albums produced by Cutfather
Albums produced by Jason Gill (musician)
Capitol Records EPs